Mayerling is a 1968 romantic tragedy film starring Omar Sharif, Catherine Deneuve, James Mason, Ava Gardner, Geneviève Page, James Robertson Justice and Andréa Parisy. It was written and directed by Terence Young. The film was made by Les Films Corona and Winchester and distributed by Metro-Goldwyn-Mayer.

It was based on the novels Mayerling by Claude Anet and L'Archiduc by Michel Arnold and the 1936 film Mayerling, directed by Anatole Litvak, which dealt with the real-life Mayerling Incident.

Plot
In the 1880s, Crown Prince Rudolf of Austria (Sharif) clashes with his father, Emperor Franz Joseph I of Austria (Mason) and his mother Empress Elisabeth (Gardner), over implementing progressive policies for their country. Rudolf soon feels he is a man born at the wrong time in a country that does not realize the need for social reform. The Prince of Wales (Robertson Justice), later to become King Edward VII of Britain, visits Vienna and provides comic relief. Later in Hungary popular revolt broke out, which Rudolf begged his father, Francis Joseph, to tolerate, but to no avail.

Rudolf finds refuge from a loveless marriage with Princess Stéphanie (Parisy) by taking a mistress, Baroness Maria Vetsera (Deneuve). Franz Joseph I sends his son to supervise military training, and further exiles Maria to Venice. When back in Vienna, the couple's mutual untimely death at Mayerling, the imperial family's hunting lodge, is cloaked in mystery. The film's ending suggests that the two lovers made a suicide pact when they decided they could not live in a world without love, nor prospects for peace.

Cast
Omar Sharif as Crown Prince Rudolf
Catherine Deneuve as Baroness Maria Vetsera
James Mason as Emperor Franz Josef
Ava Gardner as Empress Elisabeth
James Robertson Justice as Prince of Wales
Geneviève Page as Countess Larisch
Andréa Parisy as  Princess Stéphanie
Ivan Desny as Count Josef Hoyos
Fabienne Dali as Mizzi Kaspar
Véronique Vendell as Lisl Stockau
Howard Vernon as Prince Montenuovo
Irene von Meyendorf as Countess Stockau
Mony Dalmes as Baroness Helen Vetsera
Bernard Lajarrige as Loschek
Maurice Teynac as Moritz Szeps
Charles Millot as Count Taafe
Jacques Berthier as Archduke Jean Salvator
Roger Pigaut as Count Karolyi
Lyne Chardonnet as Hannah Vetsera
Moustache as Bratfisch
Roger Lumont as Inspector Losch
Jacqueline Lavielle as Marinka
Alain Saury as Baltazzi
Jean-Claude Bercq as Michel de Bragance
Jean-Michel Rouzière 
Jacques Ciron 
Liane Daydé 
Friedrich von Ledebur

See also
Mayerling (1936) feature film directed by Anatole Litvak
Mayerling (1957) TV film also directed by Litvak

References

External links
 
 
 

1968 films
British historical drama films
1960s historical drama films
Remakes of French films
1960s English-language films
Biographical films about Austrian royalty
Biographical films about British royalty
Cultural depictions of Empress Elisabeth of Austria
Cultural depictions of Franz Joseph I of Austria
Films directed by Terence Young
Films set in the 1880s
Films set in Austria
Films set in Vienna
British remakes of French films
Metro-Goldwyn-Mayer films
Romantic period films
Rudolf, Crown Prince of Austria
Films produced by Robert Dorfmann
Films scored by Francis Lai
English-language French films
French historical drama films
Films set in Austria-Hungary
1960s British films
1960s French films